The fifth season of South Park, an American animated television series created by Trey Parker and Matt Stone, began airing on June 20, 2001. The season concluded after 14 episodes on December 12, 2001. The 14-episode season length would become a standard for later years of the series, starting from the eighth season up until the seventeenth season.

Production
In 2007, Parker called Season Five "the one where shit starts getting good", and Stone said "Season Five is the best one."

Voice cast

Main cast
 Trey Parker as Stan Marsh, Eric Cartman, Randy Marsh, Mr. Garrison, Clyde Donovan, Mr. Hankey, Mr. Mackey, Stephen Stotch, Jimmy Valmer, Timmy Burch and Phillip 
 Matt Stone as Kyle Broflovski, Kenny McCormick, Butters Stotch, Gerald Broflovski, Stuart McCormick, Craig Tucker, Jimbo Kern, Terrance, Jesus, and Pip Pirrup
 Eliza Schneider as Liane Cartman, Sheila Broflovski, Shelly Marsh, Sharon Marsh, Mayor McDaniels, Mrs. McCormick, Wendy Testaburger, Principal Victoria and Ms. Crabtree
 Mona Marshall as 	Sheila Broflovski and Linda Stotch
 Isaac Hayes as Chef

Guest cast
 Thom Yorke, Jonny Greenwood, Colin Greenwood, Ed O'Brien, and Philip Selway as themselves ("Scott Tenorman Must Die")

Episodes

References

External links

 South Park Studios - official website with streaming video of full episodes.
 MUCH - full episodes for Canada

 
2001 American television seasons